Alta Laguna Park is a community park atop Temple Hill, the second highest peak of the San Joaquin Hills, in Laguna Beach, California. It is located at the north end of the Top of the World neighborhood.

Visitors can see most of Orange County from the park on a particularly clear day. The park provides a hiking and biking trailhead for the Aliso and Wood Canyons Wilderness Park.

References

Parks in Orange County, California
Municipal parks in California